Pierre Michelin (born 7 February 1937) is a French former professional footballer who played as a defensive midfielder and defender. He made five appearances for the France national team from 1963 to 1964.

International career 
Michelin made his debut for the France national team in a 1–0 loss to Bulgaria on 29 September 1963. He would go on to make four more appearances for France until 1964.

Managerial career 
Michelin coached Lille's reserve side in the 1988–89 season.

Honours 
Sedan

 Coupe Charles Drago runner-up: 1963

References 

1937 births
Living people
Sportspeople from Nord (French department)
French footballers
Association football midfielders
France international footballers
CO Roubaix-Tourcoing players
CS Sedan Ardennes players
R. Daring Club Molenbeek players
Lille OSC players

Ligue 2 players
Belgian Pro League players
Ligue 1 players
French expatriate footballers
Expatriate footballers in Belgium
French expatriate sportspeople in Belgium
French football managers
Lille OSC non-playing staff
French Division 3 (1971–1993) managers
Footballers from Hauts-de-France